Pourcieux is a commune in the Var department in the Provence-Alpes-Côte d'Azur region in southeastern France.

The small village provides a typical image of the Provence of Frédéric Mistral, with vine-grower's houses built around a castle, and a town square and fountain shaded by hundred year-old plane trees. Its sunny hillsides sit at the foot of the Monts Auréliens, a short distance from the Montagne Sainte-Victoire made famous by Paul Cézanne.

See also
Communes of the Var department

References

Communes of Var (department)